Kenneth Hutchins (born 1941) was chief of police in Northborough, Massachusetts from 1980 to 2003.

Biography
Hutchins was born and raised in Walpole, Massachusetts. He joined the Church of Jesus Christ of Latter-day Saints in 1968 after meeting with missionaries in Walpole, where he was working as a police officer at the time. He has served as a bishop, counselor in the presidency of the Boston Stake while Mitt Romney was president, president of the Boston Massachusetts Stake after Romney, as a mission president in Tampa, Florida, and as the temple president in the Boston LDS temple.

Hutchins and his wife Priscilla were scheduled to give a prayer at the 2012 Republican National Convention, the only Mormons scheduled to give a prayer there. Hutchins, under chemo treatment for active lymphoma, was contacted by Mitt Romney's son Tagg, who said his father wanted him to open the convention. Hutchins agreed but had his son Rich, a stake president in Providence, Rhode Island, as back-up if he wasn't able to attend for health reasons.

Notes

References
Deseret News Aug 22, 2012
Huffington Post Aug 22, 2012

1941 births
Converts to Mormonism
People from Walpole, Massachusetts
American leaders of the Church of Jesus Christ of Latter-day Saints
Law enforcement in Massachusetts
Mission presidents (LDS Church)
Living people
American Mormon missionaries in the United States
Latter Day Saints from Massachusetts